Sledmere and Fimber railway station was a railway station on the Malton & Driffield Railway in the East Riding of Yorkshire, England.

History
The station opened on 19 May 1853 and was sited between the villages of Sledmere and Fimber. It was closed to passengers on 5 June 1950 but remained open for goods traffic until 18 October 1958. The station was named "Fimber" until March 1858, when it briefly became "Sledmere" until May 1859, when it became "Sledmere and Fimber" until final closure of the line.

Despite being remote from both Sledmere and Fimber, the station was the most important on the MDR in terms of traffic and receipts.

Preservation 

In October 2008, the Yorkshire Wolds Railway was formed by a group of enthusiasts aiming to restore a section of the former M&D branch near the original Sledmere and Fimber railway station as a heritage tourist attraction.

References

Sources

External links
Sledmere and Fimber station at The Yorkshire Wolds Railway Restoration Project

Disused railway stations in the East Riding of Yorkshire
Former Malton and Driffield Junction Railway stations
Railway stations in Great Britain opened in 1853
Railway stations in Great Britain closed in 1950